Willow Valley is an unincorporated community in Nevada County, California. It lies at an elevation of 2746 feet (837 m).

Education
The Willow Valley school district was annexed into nearby Nevada City, California in the early 1930s.

Economy
Willow Valley was an area of gold and quartz production. Willow Valley Mining bought several gold mines in the vicinity in 1950.

References

Unincorporated communities in California
Unincorporated communities in Nevada County, California